Dhobley is a town in Afmadow District, Lower Juba, Somalia.  Dhobley is also part of Jubaland State.

References

Dhobley

Populated places in Lower Juba